Madison Township is a township in Winneshiek County, Iowa, USA.

History
Madison Township was established in 1880.

References

Townships in Winneshiek County, Iowa
Townships in Iowa